Péguékaha is a village in northern Ivory Coast. It is in the sub-prefecture of Karakoro, Korhogo Department, Poro Region, Savanes District.

Péguékaha was a commune until March 2012, when it became one of 1126 communes nationwide that were abolished.

Notes

Former communes of Ivory Coast
Populated places in Savanes District
Populated places in Poro Region